Arthur Mainwaring may refer to:
Sir Arthur Mainwaring (died 1590), MP for Shropshire (UK Parliament constituency)
Sir Arthur Mainwaring (died 1648), MP for Huntingdon
Arthur Maynwaring or Mainwaring (1668–1712), MP for Preston and West Looe